Äkräs (also Ägröi, Egres) was the god of fertility in the Finnish mythology. He was also the god of turnip and the protector of beans, peas, cabbage, flax, and hemp. In Karelia he was called Pyhä Äkräs (Holy Äkräs).

References
 Ukko-tietokanta

Finnish gods
Fertility gods
Agricultural gods